The Homalopsidae are a family of snakes which contains about 28 genera and more than 50 species.  They are commonly known as Indo-Australian water snakes, mudsnakes, or bockadams. They are also known as ular air (lit. "water snake") in Indonesian. They are typically stout-bodied water snakes, and all are mildly venomous.  Two monotypic genera are notable for their unusual morphology: Erpeton possesses a pair of short, fleshy appendages protruding from the front of the snout, and Bitia has uniquely enlarged palatine teeth.  Cerberus species have been noted to use sidewinding to cross slick mud flats during low tide. Fordonia and Gerarda are the only snakes known to tear their prey apart before eating it, pulling soft-shelled crabs through their coils to rip them apart prior to ingestion.

Genera
 Bitia Gray, 1842
 Brachyorrhos Kuhl, 1826
 Calamophis Meyer, 1874
 Cantoria Girard, 1857
 Cerberus Cuvier, 1829
 Dieurostus Berg, 1901
 Djokoiskandarus Murphy, 2011
 Enhydris Sonnini & Latreille, 1802
 Erpeton Lacépède, 1800
 Ferania Gray, 1842
 Fordonia Gray, 1837
 Gerarda Gray, 1849
 Gyiophis Murphy & Voris, 2014
 Heurnia Jong, 1926
 Homalophis Peters, 1871
 Homalopsis Kuhl & Hasselt, 1822
 Hypsiscopus Fitzinger, 1843
 Karnsophis Murphy & Voris, 2013
 Kualatahan Murphy & Voris, 2014
 Mintonophis Murphy & Voris, 2014
 Miralia Gray, 1842
Myanophis Köhler et al., 2021
 Myron Gray, 1849
 Myrrophis Kumar, Sanders, Sanil & Murphy, 2012
 Phytolopsis Gray, 1849
 Pseudoferania Ogilby, 1891
 Raclitia Gray, 1842
 Subsessor Murphy & Voris, 2014
 Sumatranus Murphy & Voris, 2014

References

External links
Homalopsisnae.com
Aquatic Snakes: Mud Snakes

Colubrids
Snake families